Bird or The Bird is a nickname for:

 Bird Averitt (1952–2020), American National Basketball Association and American Basketball Association player
 Charlie Parker (1920–1955), American jazz musician
 Ian Eagle (born 1969), American sportscaster
 Lady Bird Johnson (1912–2007), wife of US President Lyndon B. Johnson
 Mark Fidrych (1954–2009), American baseball pitcher
 Mutsuhiro Watanabe (1918–2003), Japanese World War II sergeant and war criminal
 George Yardley (1928–2004), American basketball player
 Kathleen York, American singer, songwriter and actress
 Claudio Cangia, Argentinian football player.

See also
 Dodo (nickname)
 Bird (disambiguation)
 Bird (given name)

Lists of people by nickname
Nicknames in baseball
Nicknames in basketball
Nicknames in music